People called Oddie include:

Bill Oddie (born 1941), member of The Goodies, ornithologist and television presenter
Henry Oddie (1815–1869), English lawyer, landowner and cricketer
Lily Oddie (1937–2021), provincial politician in Ontario, Canada
Tasker Oddie (1870–1950) Governor of Nevada and United States Senator

See also
Oddi (surname)
Oddy